Business Batein is  a TV programme on Doordarshan produced by the Observer India Ltd and Fiscal Fitness, a finance and business programme by the Pritish Nandy and Anuradha Prasad's production for Zee TV in the year 1992.

References

Zee TV original programming
1992 Indian television series debuts
DD National original programming